Beyond Shariati: Modernity, Cosmopolitanism, and Islam in Iranian Political Thought is a 2017 book by Siavash Saffari in which the author examines Ali Shariati's intellectual legacy. The book which is based on Saffari's doctoral dissertation at the University of Alberta, was awarded the American Political Science Association’s First Book Award in 2018.

Reception
The book has been reviewed by Abdulaziz Sachedina, Hamid Dabashi, Fred Dallmayr, Parmida Esmaeilpour, Arash Davari, Catherine Sameh, Seyed Mohammad Ali Taghavi, Adis Duderija and Mojtaba Mahdavi.

References

External links 
 Beyond Shariati

2017 non-fiction books
English-language books
Books about politics of Iran
Works about Ali Shariati
Cambridge University Press books
Theses